Simon Emilio Pond (born October 27, 1976) is a former Canadian first baseman, third baseman, and outfielder in Major League Baseball. Born in North Vancouver, British Columbia, he was originally selected by the Montreal Expos in the 8th round of the 1994 amateur draft (224th overall), and played in the Expos' farm system until 2000, when he was traded to the Cleveland Indians. He made his major league debut with the Toronto Blue Jays in 2004, and was a member of Team Canada at the 2004 Summer Olympics, where they finished in fourth place in the baseball tournament.

During the 2005 season, he was signed by the Baltimore Orioles and played with their Double-A affiliate, the Bowie Baysox.

Simon spent 2006 playing in the Pittsburgh Pirates organization with the Double-A affiliate of the Pirates, the Altoona Curve.

External links

1976 births
Akron Aeros players
Albany Polecats players
Altoona Curve players
Baseball people from British Columbia
Baseball players at the 2004 Summer Olympics
Canadian expatriate baseball players in the United States
Cape Fear Crocs players
Toronto Blue Jays players
Living people
Major League Baseball outfielders
Major League Baseball designated hitters
Major League Baseball players from Canada
Olympic baseball players of Canada
Sportspeople from North Vancouver
Vermont Expos players
Jupiter Hammerheads players
Harrisburg Senators players
Kinston Indians players
Pawtucket Red Sox players
New Haven Ravens players